Noah Smith Daniel Skirrow (born July 21, 1998) is a Canadian professional baseball pitcher for the Philadelphia Phillies organization.

Skirrow is from Cambridge, Ontario, and was raised in Stoney Creek. He attended Cardinal Newman Catholic School. He also played for the Ontario Blue Jays of the Premier Baseball League of Ontario. Skirrow enrolled at Liberty University and played college baseball for the Liberty Flames for three years. As a sophomore, he led the Atlantic Sun Conference in strikeouts per nine innings pitched. In 2019, he pitched in the Cape Cod Baseball League.

After Skirrow went undrafted in the 2020 Major League Baseball draft, which had been cut from 40 rounds to five due to the COVID-19 pandemic, the Philadelphia Phillies signed Skirrow as a free agent for the maximum allowed US$20,000 signing bonus. In 2022, he pitched for the Reading Fightin Phils of the Class AA Eastern League and the Lehigh Valley IronPigs of the Class AAA International League. He is pitching for the Canadian national baseball team in the 2023 World Baseball Classic.

References

External links

Living people
1998 births
Sportspeople from Cambridge, Ontario
Canadian baseball players
Liberty Flames baseball players
2023 World Baseball Classic players
Orleans Firebirds players
Jersey Shore BlueClaws players
Florida Complex League Phillies players
Reading Fightin Phils players
Lehigh Valley IronPigs players